Hovorbis starmuehlneri is a species of air-breathing freshwater snail, an aquatic pulmonate gastropod mollusk in the family Planorbidae the ram's horn snails and their allies.

Distribution
This species is endemic to Madagascar.

The original generic name was first changed to Africanogyrus in 2007.

References

 Brown, D.S. (1980). New and little known gastropod species of fresh and brackish waters in Africa, Madagascar and Mauritius. Journal of Molluscan Studies, 46: 208-223. London.
 Brown D.S. (1994). Freshwater snails of Africa and their medical importance. London: Taylor and Francis, 607 p. page(s): 189

starmuehlneri
Gastropods described in 1980
Taxonomy articles created by Polbot
Taxobox binomials not recognized by IUCN